Suwawa is a Philippine language spoken in North Sulawesi (Celebes), Indonesia.
It is also known as Bonda, Bone, Bunda, Bune, Suvava, and Toewawa. The language mostly spoken in Suwawa District, Regency of Bone Bolango.

References

Further reading

 
 
 

Gorontalo–Mongondow languages
Languages of Sulawesi